The Altai Krai Legislative Assembly is the regional parliament of Altai Krai, a federal subject of Russia.

The assembly consists of 68 deputies elected for a term of five years. 34 deputies are elected by single-member constituencies and another 34 deputies are elected in party lists.

History 
The first Legislative Assembly convened in March 1994. Alexander Surikov was elected its chairman. On 20 April 1995, the Charter of Altai Krai was adopted. From 1999 to 2007 the assembly was known as the Altai Krai Council of People's Deputies.

Composition

Latest election

Notes

References 

Politics of Altai Krai
Altai Krai